Barnton is a village and a civil parish in Cheshire West and Chester, England.  It contains 11 buildings that are recorded in the National Heritage List for England as designated listed buildings, all of which are at Grade II.  This grade is the lowest of the three gradings given to listed buildings and is applied to "buildings of national importance and special interest".  Running through the parish are the Trent and Mersey Canal, which passes through two tunnels, and the River Weaver together with the Weaver Navigation.  The majority of the listed buildings in the parish are associated with these transport links.  Associated with the canal are four tunnel entrances, an airshaft, two mileposts, and a terrace of cottages.  The Weaver Navigation contains Saltersford Locks, and its toll house.  The other listed building is the village church, Christ Church.

See also
Listed buildings in Anderton with Marbury
Listed buildings in Comberbach
Listed buildings in Little Leigh
Listed buildings in Northwich
Listed buildings in Weaverham

References
Citations

Sources

Listed buildings in Cheshire West and Chester
Lists of listed buildings in Cheshire